St. Margaret of Antioch Episcopal Church is a parish of the Episcopal Church in Staatsburg, New York, in the Diocese of New York. It is noted for its historic parish church, completed in 1892.

The original Episcopal Church in Staatsburg was built in 1858 and functioned as a Mission for St. James Church of Hyde Park, located several miles south of Staatsburg.  The foundation stone for the present church was laid in 1891 and the building, which was designed by Richard M. Upjohn, was completed in 1892. Upon its completion, the original church became the Staatsburg town library.

Two of the church's stained-glass windows are reputed to have come from the Chartres Cathedral and date to the 13th century. They were given to the church by Ogden Mills, Sr. in memory of his wife, Ruth Livingston Mills. A pair on the church's north side, which feature Margaret of Antioch with a dragon, appear to have been made by J. Wippell & Co., but their path to the church is unknown. The church also has a Chapman tracker organ, installed 1895 and renovated in 1985.

Horace Stringfellow was the inaugural priest and he was succeeded by Samuel R. Johnson, Chas L. Short (1876-1880), Francis J. Clayton (1880-1882), and George W.S. Ayres. It was under the latter's leadership that the congregation took the steps to become an official parish.

References

Churches completed in 1892
Churches in Dutchess County, New York
Religious organizations established in 1858
Episcopal church buildings in New York (state)
Richard Upjohn church buildings